The Ambassador of Thailand to Egypt is the official representative of Thailand to the Government of Egypt. The official title of the ambassador is the Ambassador Extraordinary and Plenipotentiary at the Royal Thai Embassy in Egypt, with the official post at the Royal Thai Embassy in Cairo. The current ambassador serves concurrently as the chief diplomat to Djibouti, Sudan and Ethiopia.

List of representatives

References

Egypt
Thailand